Hydrangea hypoglauca is a species of flowering plant in the family Hydrangeaceae, native to China.

External links
 Hydrangea hypoglauca at www.efloras.org.

hypoglauca
Flora of China